Gronowo may refer to the following places:
Gronowo, Kuyavian-Pomeranian Voivodeship (north-central Poland)
Gronowo, Braniewo County in Warmian-Masurian Voivodeship (north Poland)
Gronowo, Działdowo County in Warmian-Masurian Voivodeship (north Poland)
Gronowo, Lidzbark County in Warmian-Masurian Voivodeship (north Poland)
Gronowo, Mrągowo County in Warmian-Masurian Voivodeship (north Poland)
Gronowo, West Pomeranian Voivodeship (north-west Poland)

See also
Gronów (disambiguation)